Dick Steane (26 September 1939 – 3 June 2007) was a British sprinter who competed in the 1968 Summer Olympics.

References

1939 births
2007 deaths
British male sprinters
English male sprinters
Olympic athletes of Great Britain
Athletes (track and field) at the 1968 Summer Olympics
Universiade medalists in athletics (track and field)
Sportspeople from the Isle of Wight
Universiade gold medalists for Great Britain
Medalists at the 1963 Summer Universiade
Members of Thames Valley Harriers